"Call the Man" is a song by Canadian singer Celine Dion, recorded for her fourth English-language album, Falling into You (1996). It was released as the fifth and last single outside of North America on 9 June 1997. "Call the Man" was written by Andy Hill and Peter Sinfield, who had already written Dion's 1995 smash hit "Think Twice". The song was produced by Jim Steinman, who had also worked on her previous pop single, "It's All Coming Back to Me Now".

Background and release
The single was released during the second European leg of the Falling into You Tour and peaked at number 8 in Ireland and 11 in the United Kingdom, where it has sold over 80,000 copies.

On 17 April 1997 Dion performed "Call the Man" with a 30-voice gospel choir during the World Music Awards ceremony. She was the big star of that evening, winning three awards: Best-selling Canadian Female Singer, Best-selling Artist and Best-selling Pop Artist, after selling over 25 million albums in 1996. It was the second year in a row that Dion has sold more than 20 million copies worldwide. Dion performed the song during her 1996/1997 Falling Into You: Around the World tour.

In 2008, "Call the Man" was included on the European version of My Love: Ultimate Essential Collection.

Critical reception
Pip Ellwood-Hughes from Entertainment Focus declared the song as a "huge sing-a-long anthem". A reviewer from Music & Media viewed it as an "epic ballad". British magazine Music Week rated it three out of five, describing it as "Streisand-esque warblings from Dion on this emotive Jim Steinman-produced ballad", and "not as memorable as Think Twice." Bob Waliszewski of Plugged In wrote that "Call the Man", "which praises a nameless individual capable of calming the chaos and confusion in life with “love beyond repair,” could easily be interpreted as a song about Jesus." Ealing Leader noted that Dion is "in sad, wistful mood for this potent ballad". Christopher Smith from TalkAboutPopMusic described it as a "long and brooding epic [that] is full of theatrics and drama".

Music video
The music video for "Call the Man" was directed by Greg Masuak in 1995 and already used for two other songs in edited versions: "Je sais pas" and "Next Plane Out".

Formats and track listings

 European CD single
"Call the Man" (Radio Edit) – 4:15
"Medley Starmania" (Live) – 6:33

 UK cassette single
"Call the Man" (Radio Edit) – 4:15
"Medley Starmania" (Live) – 6:33
"Because You Loved Me" (Live) – 4:49

 European/UK CD maxi-single
"Call the Man" (Radio Edit) – 4:15
"Medley Starmania" (Live) – 6:33
"If We Could Start Over" – 4:23
"Refuse to Dance" – 4:23

 UK CD maxi-single #2
"Call the Man" (Album Version) – 6:08
"Little Bit of Love" – 4:26
"Did You Give Enough Love" – 4:20
"Because You Loved Me" (Live) – 4:49

Personnel
According to the liner notes of Falling Into You

Celine Dion – Lead Vocals
Jeff Bova – Keyboards
Ottmar Liebert – Acoustic Guitar
Shelton Becton – Backing Vocals
Sharon Bryant-Gallwey – Backing Vocals
Angela Clemmons-Patrick – Backing Vocals
Curtis King – Backing Vocals

Charts

Weekly charts

Year-end charts

Release history

References

External links

1996 songs
1997 singles
1990s ballads
Celine Dion songs
Pop ballads
Song recordings produced by Jim Steinman
Songs with lyrics by Peter Sinfield
Songs written by Andy Hill (composer)
Song recordings with Wall of Sound arrangements